Daniel Brown (born 5 July 1991) is a professional racing driver based in the UK with a successful history starting in karting at the age of 12 and has become recognised within the sports car world as a fast, consistent and reliable driver, with numerous race wins in the GT3 category across Europe.

Racing career
Brown has a successful racing history starting at the age of 12 in Rotax MiniMax, finishing 3rd for 2004 and 2nd for 2005 at Lydd International Raceway.

Brown moved to the very competitive series of T Cars at the age of 14. The sheer pace of the T Cars fuelled Daniel's passion for Motorsport, which drove Daniel to finishing 2007 as T Cars Champion.

In 2008, Brown competed in the FPA Championship, with a proven record of Pole Positions – Race Wins – Fastest laps, Daniel caused a stir in the Formula Palmer Audi 2008 Championship. Daniel finished 8th, and highest placed rookie, but left the championship looking for something different.

2009 brought a new challenge in the form of GT racing, Brown competed in the Avon Tyres British GT Championship for Rollcentre Racing. With a double victory on his debut weekend, Daniel immediately made his mark in the Sportscar world.

In 2010, Brown returned to the British GT Championship series at the wheel of a Ferrari 430 Scuderia GT3. Brown teamed up with rapid veteran Chris Hyman in a car backed by fuel additive brand STP, Daniel achieved a number of successes throughout the season and became recognised by the BRDC as a Rising Star of UK motorsport.

For 2011, Brown teamed up with Glynn Geddie in the FIA GT3 European Championship, driving for leading Italian squad AF Corse in a Ferrari 458 GT3. During 2011, Daniel was recognised for his driving talents and successes at a high level, and became one of the youngest, full members of the BRDC.

Brown is becoming well known for his driving talents and continued through the ranks of GT racing by moving into the Blancpain Endurance Series for 2012. He again teamed up with the leading Italian team, AF Corse in Ferrari 458 GT3 and took part in the famous 24 Hours of Spa.

2013 saw Brown return to the British GT Championship in a BMW Z4 GT3 driving for the leading UK team, Triple Eight Racing. Daniel had a successful year finishing on the podium 3 times and ending the season 6th in the championship.

Brown made the move into the European Le Mans Series in 2014, driving for Gulf Racing in an Aston Martin Vantage GTE with Stuart Hall and Roald Goethe. The 5 round series visits some of Europe's most famous circuits.

Motorsports career results

NASCAR
(key) (Bold – Pole position awarded by qualifying time. Italics – Pole position earned by points standings or practice time. * – Most laps led.)

Camping World Truck Series

References

External links
 

1991 births
Living people
British racing drivers
European Le Mans Series drivers
NASCAR drivers
24H Series drivers